The Supercar Challenge is a motor racing series centered on the Benelux. A special feature is that touring cars, GTs and Sportscars can all participate on an equal basis within the same class, enabled by very open regulations. The championship was first held in 2001, after replacing the Supercar Cup. From 2001 to 2011 the championship was called the Dutch Supercar Challenge, but due to interest from drivers, teams and tracks outside the Netherlands the organisers decided to drop 'Dutch' from its name on 11 February 2012.

Format and regulations
A typical race weekend exists of the usual practice on Friday and Saturday, qualifying on Saturday and two races of 45 to 60 minutes with one pit stop of at least 60 seconds. One race is on Saturday and one Sunday. The four classes usually run separate races two classes at a time. The two fastest run together and the two slowest run their race separate. The exception is at Spa-Francorchamps where all four classes can and do run together in two races over the weekend. All races are started from a rolling start though in the past standing starts have been used as well. "Success time" is awarded after every race. The first-place finisher gets 15 seconds, second place gets 10, third place gets 5, fourth place loses 5 seconds, fifth place loses ten and all below fifth place lose 15 seconds. This is added to the time of the minimum pit stop duration. The reason no "success ballast" is used, is the immense variety in vehicles competing. For instance, a 50 kg weight has a much larger effect on a Lotus Elise than it has on a Dodge Viper Competition Coupe even though these can compete in the same class.

Classes
 Sport I - Vehicles over 5.2 kg/bhp. Engines maximum 3000cc and 6 cylinders.
 Supersport II - Vehicles over 4.7 kg/bhp but under 5.2 kg/bhp. Engines maximum 5000 cc and 8 cylinders.
 Supersport I - Vehicles over 3.7 kg/bhp but under 4.7 kg/bhp. Minimum mass is 1080 kg. Engines as in Supersport II
 GT - Vehicles over 2.7 kg/bhp but under 3.6 kg/bhp. Minimum mass is 1180 kg.

Single make series
During most of its lifetime the Supercar Challenge has served as a host to many single make series. In the first two years the Marcos Mantis Cup ran within the GT class. In 2003 it was fully integrated in the GT class. Starting in 2008 the Mosler Challenge has run within GT. In 2010 three series were added. Those are BRL V6 and the Saker Challenge, not to be confused with the series of the same name the DNRT hosts, both within Supersport I and BRL Light in Supersport II. The BRL series were before separate events and still have a slightly different calendar. The races at Silverstone don't pay them points while the races at the Zolder truck Grand Prix do though to all other classes they don't count.

Champions

Supercar Challenge

BRL V6

SEAT León Supercopa

Notes
1 – The SEAT León Supercopa class was a class for just SEATs within the Supersport class.
2 – The SEAT León Supercopa class was a class for just SEATs within the Sport class.

Other Champions

GT & Prototype Challenge

References

External links
Supercar Challenge website

Sports car racing series
Touring car racing series
Auto racing series in the Netherlands
Auto racing series in Belgium
Group GT3